Henri-Frédéric Iselin (1826–1905) was a French sculptor.

Born in Clairegoutte, Haute-Saône, he was a pupil of François Rude. He started at the Salon in 1849 and became famous and successful, sculpting many portraits.

He died in Paris in 1905.

Main works

Iselin created many statues or busts, including those of : 
 Napoléon III (Château de Compiègne)
 Eugénie de Montijo (Vesoul, musée Georges-Garret)
 Charles Auguste Louis Joseph, duc de Morny (Deauville and Château de Compiègne)
 Mérimée (Paris, Bibliothèque Nationale)
 Joachim Murat (Versailles, museum)
 Boileau (Paris, musée d'Orsay)
 Claude Bernard (Château de Versailles)
 Mirabeau (Versailles, Salle du Jeu de Paume)
 François Miron (Hôtel de Ville de Paris),
 Louis-Benoît Picard (Paris, Institut de France)
 Denis Poisson (Vesoul, musée Georges-Garret)
 Général de Lamoricière (Vesoul, musée Georges-Garret)
 Louis Lagrange (Vesoul, musée Georges-Garret)
 Pierre Gardel (Paris, Académie nationale de musique)
 L'Élégance (Opéra Garnier)

1826 births
1905 deaths
People from Haute-Saône
19th-century French sculptors
French male sculptors
19th-century French male artists